Eisel is a German surname that may refer to the following people:
Bernhard Eisel (born 1981), Austrian road bicycling racer 
Fritz Eisel (1929–2010), German painter and graphic artist 
Mary-Ann Eisel (born 1946), American tennis player

See also
Easel

References

German-language surnames